Calcium magnesium acetate (CMA) is a deicer and can be used as an alternative to road salt. CMA can also be used as an H2S capture agent.

Production
CMA can be produced from a reaction of a magnesium/calcium compound with glacial acetic acid. If it is reacted with dolomite or dolomitic lime, acetic acid does not need to be concentrated to produce CMA. Acetic acid production requires the fermentation of organic material which must be carried out at a pH around 6.0. Separating agents used to recover acetic acid must therefore maintain a high capacity while within this pH range. Amberlite LA-2 in 1-octanol diluent maintains nearly full capacity up to a pH value of 6.0 and is readily regenerated by aqueous, slaked dolomitic lime to form CMA, making it a good acetic acid separating agent for CMA production.

Use as road deicer
Sodium chloride road salt costs less than $50 per ton to produce but is corrosive to metals in highway structures and increases the concentration of sodium in drinking water, which can lead to adverse health effects. Alternative deicing substances have been sought to alleviate these problems. CMA has been found to be an effective deicer and environmentally benign, though its production cost of $650 per ton is much greater than the cost of road salt. Using estimates based on New York State Data, a 1992 report in the Journal of Policy Analysis and Management concluded that $615 per ton would be saved in vehicle corrosion and that $75 per ton would be saved in aesthetic damage to roadside trees if the state highway agencies switched to using CMA as a deicer instead of sodium chloride rock salt, far outweighing its initial production cost. The report also warned that excessive federal subsidization of CMA could encourage its inefficient overuse.

Use for H2S removal
CMA has the ability to form highly cenospheric oxide particles when heated to high temperatures, which contain thin, porous walls that are effective at capturing hydrogen sulfide from temperatures from 700 to 1100 °C up to 90%. Integrated gasification combined cycle (IGCC) systems are used to convert coal into clean, usable fuel gas which is then used to run gas turbine systems for power generation. An essential step in this conversion process is the elimination of the environmentally harmful H2S and COS from the gas that is formed from sulfur contained in the coal.

Desulfurization mechanism
CMA (CaMg2(CH3COO)6) decomposes around 380-400 °C to produce the following products: CaCO3, MgO, CH3COCH3, and CO2. CaCO3 further decomposes around 700 °C to CaO and CO2. A sulfidation reaction then takes place when CaO is reacted with H2S at reducing conditions in a gasifier, yielding CaS and H2O. CaS is finally reacted with O2 to produce inert CaSO4 which can then be disposed of.

References

External links
 Material safety data sheet

Further reading

 Rea, C. L., & LaPerriere, J. D. (1985). Effects of Calcium Magnesium Acetate, a Road Deicer, on the Lentic Environment in Interior Alaska. AK-RD-86-02, Alaska Department of Transportation and Public Facilities, Fairbanks, AK.

Acetates
Calcium compounds
Magnesium compounds